Abrumand Rural District is a rural district (dehestan) in the Central District of Bahar County, Hamadan Province, Iran. At the 2006 census, its population was 8,624, in 1,985 families. The rural district has 11 villages.

References 

Rural Districts of Hamadan Province
Bahar County